Sue Bruce (born 25 July 1964) is a New Zealand-British former long-distance runner who competed mainly in cross country running and track. She ran for New Zealand at five straight editions of the IAAF World Cross Country Championships from 1983 to 1987. She shared in the team silver medal at the 1986 race alongside Christine McMiken, Gail Rear, Mary O'Connor and Wendy Renner, and was a team bronze medallist at the 1984 race with Dianne Rodger, O'Connor, and Christine Hughes.  Her best individual finish was eighth place in 1985.

Bruce won the 3000 metres title at the New Zealand Athletics Championships in 1985, her sole national title at the competition.

International competitions

National titles
New Zealand Athletics Championships
3000 m: 1985
British 100 Kilometres Championships: 2005

References

External links

1964 births
Living people
New Zealand female long-distance runners
British female long-distance runners
English female long-distance runners
New Zealand female cross country runners
Female ultramarathon runners